Kuntur Sinqa (Quechua kuntur condor, sinqa nose, "condor nose", also spelled Condor Sencca, Condorsencca) is a viewpoint in Peru. It is situated in the Cusco Region, La Convención Province, Echarate District. The viewpoint is a kind of balcony made out of concrete and metal which runs around a rock. The balcony of Kuntur Sinqa is considered one of the outstanding works of engineering of the Cusco Region.

References 

Cusco Region